Francis Perry Taylor (born 12 October 1909, date of death unknown) was a Scottish amateur footballer who played as an outside forward in the Scottish League for Queen's Park. He was capped by Scotland at amateur level.

References 

Scottish footballers
Queen's Park F.C. players
Scottish Football League players
Scotland amateur international footballers
Association football outside forwards
Year of death missing
Footballers from Glasgow
1909 births